Christian Hintze Holm (born 8 December 1964) is a Norwegian politician for the Socialist Left Party.

He served as a deputy representative to the Norwegian Parliament from Akershus during the term 2001–2005.

On the local level Holm is the mayor of Nesodden since 2003.

References

1964 births
Living people
Deputy members of the Storting
Socialist Left Party (Norway) politicians
Mayors of places in Akershus
People from Nesodden
Place of birth missing (living people)